Faisal Hashmi is an Indian film director and screenwriter. His first Gujarati feature film, Vitamin She, ran for six weeks housefull into theatres and was a phenomenon at the box office. Later, he wrote and directed Gujarati's very first science fiction feature, Short Circuit, and paved the way for a new genre in Gujarati cinema. Short Circuit was a box office success spanning four weeks at the box office and was applauded by fans and critics across Gujarat.

Faisal is making his Bollywood debut with a high-concept thriller titled "Cancer" starring Aahana Kumra and Sharib Hashmi.

Early life and education 
Faisal was born on August 1st, 1985 in Palanpur. His father is a teacher and his mother is a homemaker. Jurassic Park had an enormous impact on his mind when it came out and he decided to become a filmmaker. Steven Spielberg is his biggest inspiration. He was introduced to comic books and Amar Chitra Katha comics in his childhood. Those superheroes made a huge impact on him and developed his penchant for never before seen worlds and characters. Faisal is a well-known comic nerd. He possesses a vast collection (more than 6000) of comics in his personal collection. He has a deep interest in astronomy and science. He regularly posts about the universe and other scientific discoveries on his social media accounts. He graduated in mechanical engineering. His parents wanted him to work as an engineer, but he liked movies. Instead of accepting a secure engineering job, he decided to pursue filmmaking.

Career
Faisal made his debut with a Gujarati language feature film Vitamin She which was a huge success at the box office and earned him accolades from the industry. It ran for six housefull weeks in theaters and is considered one of the biggest Gujarati hits in the year 2017. Faisal's second Gujarati feature film was "Daud Pakad", a comedy thriller. After Daud Pakad, Faisal wrote and directed the first-ever Gujarati sci-fi feature film Short Circuit. It was the first film that used a high-end technical crew from Bollywood as well as South India. The film received positive reviews from critics as well as the audience upon its release and was praised for its direction, plot, VFX, and performances and had a four-week successful run at the box office. His upcoming Gujarati film is a horror-comedy titled "Faati Ne?" that will be shot in Melbourne, Australia.

In November 2022, Faisal announced his Bollywood debut titled "Cancer" - a high-concept thriller starring Aahana Kumra and Sharib Hashmi.

Accolades
His film Vitamin She got 6 nominations in the Gujarati Iconic Film Awards (GIFA) and won the Best supporting actor category for actor Smit Pandya. His second film Short Circuit got 11 nominations in GIFA including Best Director, Best story, best screenplay, and best dialogues for Faisal Hashmi. Short Circuit was also nominated at IGFF (International Gujarati Film Festival) for several nominations and won Best editor.

Filmography

References

External links 
 
 

1985 births
Living people
Gujarati-language film directors
21st-century Indian film directors
Indian male screenwriters
Gujarati people
Film directors from Gujarat
Screenwriters from Gujarat